Grégory Malicki (born 23 November 1973) is a French former professional footballer. He last played for Angers SCO as a goalkeeper, also acting as club captain.

Honours
Lille
UEFA Intertoto Cup: 2004

References

External links
 
 

1973 births
Living people
French footballers
Association football goalkeepers
Chamois Niortais F.C. players
Stade Rennais F.C. players
US Créteil-Lusitanos players
LB Châteauroux players
Lille OSC players
Dijon FCO players
Angers SCO players
Ligue 1 players
Ligue 2 players
People from Thiais
Footballers from Val-de-Marne